The Delhi–Jaipur line connects Jaipur city with Delhi, the capital of India and is present of Ahmedabad–Delhi main line.

There are about 22 trains connecting Delhi to Jaipur, fastest one, ADI – SJ Rajdhani taking 4 hours 25 minutes. and Delhi–Jaipur Double Decker taking 4 hours 30 minutes.

The route also faces delays in normal running during winter period because of fog. Throughout the route, there are two parallel railway lines running, helping in swift movement of trains without any delays.

History
Rajputana State Railway opened the Delhi–Bandikui -wide metre-gauge line in 1874, extended it to Ajmer in 1875 and to Ahmedabad in 1881.

The Delhi–Ajmer line was converted to -wide broad gauge in 1994. The Ajmer-Ahmedabad line was converted to -wide broad gauge in 1997.

Passenger movement
, on this line, is the only railway station which is amongst the top hundred booking stations of Indian Railway.

References

External links
Jaipur New Delhi trains

5 ft 6 in gauge railways in India
Rail transport in Rajasthan
Rail transport in Haryana
Rail transport in Delhi